Anna: Kisan Baburao Hazare is an  Indian biographical film, directed and written by Shashank Udapurkar. It is based on the life of  Indian social activist Anna Hazare. Shashank Udapurkar, director of the film, himself would be playing the titular character. The film also stars Tanishaa Mukerji, Govind Namdev, Sharat Saxena, Kishor Kadam, Daya Shankar Pandey, Ankit (Sourabh) Sharma  in supporting roles. The film was released on 14 October 2016.

Cast
Shashank Udapurkar as Kisan Baburao Hazare
Tanishaa Mukerji as Shikha, journalist
Ankit  Sharma as cameraman
Govind Namdev as village Sahukar
Narendra Jain
Kishor Kadam as Appa
Daya Shankar Pandey as Ramya
Jayant Gadekar as Dinkar Rao
Sharat Saxena as Col Sharat Saxena
Rajit Kapoor as Rajat Sharma, news editor
Arif Zakaria as school master
Atul Shrivastava as Dixit
Anant Jog as Prakash Mane
Prasanna Ketkar
Ashwini Giri
Girish Pardeshi
Vikas Shrivastava
Bhagwan Tiwari
Shashi Chaturvedi
Aagaz Virk
Ajay Tapkire
Atharva Padhye
Saurabh Sharma
Nutan
Mazhar Khan
Baldev Trehan
Princy Lakra
Tukaram Bidkar
Gopal Singh Kochar
Nana Deshmukh
Durgesh Korade
Chaitanya Deshmukh
Chandrakant Karale

Production

Development
Movie director Shashank Udapurkar, addressed the media that he has received a formal consent from Anna Hazare for making a biopic on the anti-corruption activist, in April 2014.

Promotion
Anna Hazare himself promoted his biopic on The Kapil Sharma Show.

References

External links
 

2016 biographical drama films
Indian biographical drama films
Drama films based on actual events
2016 drama films
Columbia Pictures films
Sony Pictures films
Sony Pictures Networks India films